Smooth Island may refer to:

Smooth Island (Antarctica)
Smooth Island (Tasmania), Australia
Smooth Island (South Australia)
Smooth Island (Nunavut), Canada; 3 separate islands, each named Smooth Island
Smooth Island (Ontario), Canada